Archibald Harley (October 10, 1824 – May 19, 1904) was a farmer and political figure in Ontario, Canada. He represented Oxford South in the House of Commons of Canada from 1882 to 1887 as a Liberal member.

He was born in Newcastle, New Brunswick, the son of William Harley, a land surveyor, and was educated in Hamilton, Ontario. In 1847, he married Elizabeth Stewart. For a time, he was involved in the lumber business in Ancaster with his brother-in-law James F. Wilson. Harley served as a member of the council for Burford Township, also serving as deputy reeve and reeve for the township and warden for Brant County.

References 
 
The Canadian parliamentary companion, 1883 JA Gemmill

1824 births
1904 deaths
Members of the House of Commons of Canada from Ontario
Liberal Party of Canada MPs